Plata O Plomo is the collaborative studio album by American rappers Fat Joe and Remy Ma, released February 17, 2017 by RNG (Rap's New Generation) and Empire.

Background
The title of the album, "plata o plomo", translates from Spanish to "silver or lead", meaning "money or bullets". The phrase was used by Colombian drug lord Pablo Escobar who would offer government officials and law enforcement the choice of taking a bribe, or having a murder contract placed against them. Fat Joe commented: "the name of the album is called Plata o Plomo... money or bullets. You know what I'm saying? However you want it."

Critical response

Neil Yeung of AllMusic gave the album 3.5 out of 5 stars, praising the album for its mix of old school hip-hop with a new modern radio-friendly sound, saying that the album "plays like a mixtape (or playlist) with a wide variety of club-friendly hip-hop that often tugs on '90s nostalgia heartstrings while updating their sound with 2017 production". XXL gave the album a 4 out of 5 stars, noting that the album is a "a triumphant return for Fat Joe and Remy Ma. Scott Glaysher of HipHopDX gave the album a 3.2 out of 5 stars, saying "Plata O Plomo was definitely made with the right intentions and features some solid rapping but the most memorable moment remains “All the Way Up” which has since been inducted into Hip Hop's overplayed archives."

In a negative review, Evan Rytlewski of Pitchfork gave the album a 5.3 out of 10, and also said "On this collaborative LP, their hard styles are too similar to make for a compelling dynamic."

Commercial performance
Plata O Plomo debuted at number 44 on the Billboard 200 chart, earning 11,158 album-equivalent units in its first week. The album also debuted at number 19 on the US Top R&B/Hip-Hop Albums chart and number three on the US Independent Albums charts respectively.

Track listing

Charts

References

External links

2017 albums
E1 Music albums
Fat Joe albums
Remy Ma albums
Collaborative albums
Albums produced by Cool & Dre
Empire Distribution albums